Spondylosis is the degeneration of the vertebral column from any cause. In the more narrow sense it refers to spinal osteoarthritis, the age-related wear and tear of the spinal column, which is the most common cause of spondylosis. The degenerative process in osteoarthritis chiefly affects the vertebral bodies, the neural foramina and the facet joints (facet syndrome). If severe, it may cause pressure on the spinal cord or nerve roots with subsequent sensory or motor disturbances, such as pain, paresthesia, imbalance, and muscle weakness in the limbs.

When the space between two adjacent vertebrae narrows, compression of a nerve root emerging from the spinal cord may result in radiculopathy (sensory and motor disturbances, such as severe pain in the neck, shoulder, arm, back, or leg, accompanied by muscle weakness).  Less commonly, direct pressure on the spinal cord (typically in the cervical spine) may result in myelopathy, characterized by global weakness, gait dysfunction, loss of balance, and loss of bowel or bladder control. The patient may experience shocks (paresthesia) in hands and legs because of nerve compression and lack of blood flow. If vertebrae of the neck are involved it is labelled cervical spondylosis. Lower back spondylosis is labeled lumbar spondylosis. The term is from Ancient Greek σπόνδυλος spóndylos, "a vertebra", in plural "vertebrae – the backbone".

Signs and symptoms

Complications
A rare but severe complication of this disease is vertebrobasilar insufficiency. This is a result of the vertebral artery becoming occluded as it passes up in the transverse foramen. The spinal joints become stiff in cervical spondylosis. Thus the chondrocytes which maintain the disc become deprived of nutrition and die. Secondary osteophytes may cause stenosis for spinal nerves, manifesting as radiculopathy.

Causes
Spondylosis is caused from years of constant abnormal pressure, caused by joint subluxation, stress induced by sports, acute and/or repetitive trauma, or poor posture, being placed on the vertebrae and the discs between them.  The abnormal stress causes the body to form new bone in order to compensate for the new weight distribution.  This abnormal weight bearing from bone displacement will cause spondylosis to occur.  Poor postures and loss of the normal spinal curves can lead to spondylosis as well.  Spondylosis can affect a person at any age; however, older people are more susceptible.

Diagnosis

There are multiple techniques used in the diagnosis of spondylosis, these are;
 Cervical Compression Test, a variant of Spurling's test, is performed by laterally flexing the patient's head and placing downward pressure on it. Neck or shoulder pain on the ipsilateral side (i.e., the side to which the head is flexed) indicates a positive result for this test. A positive test result is not necessarily a positive result for spondylosis and as such additional testing is required.
 Lhermitte sign: feeling of electrical shock with patient neck flexion
 Reduced range of motion of the neck, the most frequent objective finding on physical examination
 MRI and CT scans are helpful for pain diagnosis but generally are not definitive and must be considered together with physical examinations and history.

Treatment
Many of the treatments for cervical spondylosis have not been subjected to rigorous, controlled trials. Surgery is advocated for cervical radiculopathy in patients who have intractable pain, progressive symptoms, or weakness that fails to improve with conservative therapy. Surgical indications for cervical spondylosis with myelopathy (CSM) remain somewhat controversial, but "most clinicians recommend operative therapy over conservative therapy for moderate-to-severe myelopathy".

Physical therapy may be effective for restoring range of motion, flexibility and core strengthening. Decompressive therapies (i.e., manual mobilization, mechanical traction) may also help alleviate pain. However, physical therapy and osteopathy cannot "cure" the degeneration, and some people view that strong compliance with postural modification is necessary to realize maximum benefit from decompression, adjustments and flexibility rehabilitation.

Surgery 
Current surgical procedures used to treat spondylosis aim to alleviate the signs and symptoms of the disease by decreasing pressure in the spinal canal (decompression surgery) and/or by controlling spine movement (fusion surgery) but the evidence is limited in support of some aspects of these procedures.

Decompression surgery: The vertebral column can be operated on from both an anterior and posterior approach. The approach varies depending on the site and cause of root compression. Commonly, osteophytes and portions of intervertebral disc are removed.

Fusion surgery: Performed when there is evidence of spinal instability or mal-alignment. Use of instrumentation (such as pedicle screws) in fusion surgeries varies across studies.

See also
 Laminectomy

References

Further reading

External links 

Skeletal disorders
Vertebral column disorders